This article is a list of historic places in the Calgary Region, in Alberta, which have been entered into the national Register of Historic Places, which includes federal, provincial, and municipal properties. A few are in the national park system.

List

See also 

 List of historic places in Alberta
 List of historic places in the Edmonton Capital Region
 National Historic Sites in Alberta

Calgary Region
Calgary-related lists
Calgary